Alejandro Osorio Carvajal (born 28 May 1998) is a Colombian cyclist, who currently rides for UCI Continental team .

Osorio originally signed with UCI WorldTeam  for 2022 and 2023 seasons but his contract was terminated in April 2022 after the team claimed Osorio committed multiple contract breaches. For the rest of the 2022 season he joined Colombian amateur team .

Major results
2018
 1st  Mountains classification, Tour de l'Avenir
 6th Overall Giro Ciclistico d'Italia
1st Stage 4
2021
 1st  Mountains classification, Settimana Internazionale di Coppi e Bartali
 6th Overall Vuelta Asturias
2022
 Clásica Carmen de Viboral
1st Stages 1 (TTT) & 4
 3rd Overall Clásica de Girardot

References

External links

1998 births
Living people
Colombian male cyclists
Sportspeople from Antioquia Department